Saša Stevanović (born 4 August 1974) is a Serbian former professional footballer who played as a goalkeeper.

Club career
After starting out at his hometown club Radnički Kragujevac, Stevanović also played for Sartid Smederevo (1998–2000) and OFK Beograd (2000–2004) in his homeland, before moving to Hungarian side Győr in the summer of 2004. He spent the next 10 years at the club, amassing a total of 258 league appearances. In the 2012–13 season, Stevanović helped Győr win their first national championship title after 30 years.

International career
In 2001, Stevanović was capped three times for FR Yugoslavia. He was also a member of the team that won the Millennium Super Soccer Cup earlier that year, making one appearance in the process. However, these caps are not officially recognized by FIFA.

Honours
Győr
 Nemzeti Bajnokság I: 2012–13
 Szuperkupa: 2013
 Magyar Kupa: Runner-up 2008–09, 2012–13

References

External links

 
 
 

Association football goalkeepers
Expatriate footballers in Hungary
First League of Serbia and Montenegro players
FK Radnički 1923 players
FK Smederevo players
Győri ETO FC players
Nemzeti Bajnokság I players
OFK Beograd players
Serbia and Montenegro expatriate footballers
Serbia and Montenegro expatriate sportspeople in Hungary
Serbia and Montenegro footballers
Serbia and Montenegro international footballers
Serbian expatriate footballers
Serbian expatriate sportspeople in Hungary
Serbian footballers
Sportspeople from Kragujevac
1974 births
Living people